Houaïlou  is a commune in the North Province of New Caledonia, an overseas territory of France in the Pacific Ocean.

Geography

Climate

Houaïlou has a tropical monsoon climate (Köppen climate classification Am).

Demographics 
The town is part of the Ajië-Aro Kanak cultural grouping, and Ajië is the local language. Over 90% of the population identified as Kanak in the 2014 census. There are some European mine workers and farmers, and a small number of Polynesians, and Asian from different countries.

Economy 
The formal economy is based almost exclusively on nickel mining operations, with two local mines - Maï at Poro the Ballande mines at Bâ. Locals can train for mining jobs at the CFTMC in Poro. Service activities include the local administration and gendarmerie, schools, several small shops and other facilities.

Local Kanak tribes have traditionally operated a semi subsistence economy, with some waged labour, migrant income, and substantial cultivation. Houaïlou's farmers produce Lychees, a fruit introduced by a colonist from Réunion, Jolimont Kabar. There is a Fête du letchi each December, although production is unreliable in this climate and the festival is sometimes cancelled.

Notable people 

 Georges Baudoux (1870-1949), author, lived in Houaïlou from 1928 to 1948 
 Maurice Leenhardt (1878-1954), Protestant missionary, translator, and later anthropologist, built up the Protestant mission Dö Nèvâ 3 km upstream in the Houaïlou valley in 1902, and lived there until 1922. 
 Delin Wéma, anti-independence Kanak politician. Minister of Education in the New Caledonia government, 1984–1985.

References

 Michel Naepels. 1998. Histoires de terres kanakes (Conflts fonciers et rapports sociaux dans la région de Houaïlou). Paris: Belin.
 Michel Naepels. 2013. Conjurer la guerre (Violence et pouvoir à Houaïlou, NC). Paris: EHESS.

Communes of New Caledonia